Daidzein (7-hydroxy-3-(4-hydroxyphenyl)-4H-chromen-4-one) is a naturally occurring compound found exclusively in soybeans and other legumes and structurally belongs to a class of compounds known as isoflavones. Daidzein and other isoflavones are produced in plants through the phenylpropanoid pathway of secondary metabolism and are used as signal carriers, and defense responses to pathogenic attacks. In humans, recent research has shown the viability of using daidzein in medicine for menopausal relief, osteoporosis, blood cholesterol, and lowering the risk of some hormone-related cancers, and heart disease. Despite the known health benefits, the use of both puerarin and daidzein is limited by their poor bioavailability and low water solubility.

Natural occurrence
Daidzein and other isoflavone compounds, such as genistein, are present in a number of plants and herbs like kwao krua (Pueraria mirifica) and kudzu. It can also be found in Maackia amurensis cell cultures. Daidzein can be found in food such as soybeans and soy products like tofu and textured vegetable protein. Soy isoflavones are a group of compounds found in and isolated from the soybean. Of note, total isoflavones in soybeans are—in general—37 percent daidzein, 57 percent genistein and 6 percent glycitein, according to USDA data. Soy germ contains 41.7 percent daidzein.

Biosynthesis

History
The isoflavonoid pathway has long been studied because of its prevalence in a wide variety of plant species, including as pigmentation in many flowers, as well as serving as signals in plants and microbes. The isoflavone synthase (IFS) enzyme was suggested to be a P-450 oxygenase family, and this was confirmed by Shinichi Ayabe's laboratory in 1999. IFS exists in two isoforms that can use both liquiritigenin and naringenin to give daidzein and genistein respectively.

Pathway
Daidzein is an isoflavonoid derived from the shikimate pathway that forms an oxygen containing heterocycle through a cytochrome P-450-dependent enzyme that is NADPH dependent.

The biosynthesis of daidzein begins with L-phenylalanine and undergoes a general phenylpropanoid pathway where the shikimate derived aromatic ring is shifted to the adjacent carbon of the heterocycle. The process begins with phenylalanine ligase (PAL) cleaving the amino group from L-Phe forming the unsaturated carboxylic acid, cinnamic acid. Cinnamic acid is then hydroxylated by membrane protein cinnamate-4-hydroxylase (C4H) to form p-coumaric acid. P-coumaric acid then acts as the starter unit which gets loaded with coenzyme A by 4-coumaroyl:CoA-ligase (4CL). The starter unit (A) then undergoes three iterations of malonyl-CoA resulting in (B), which enzymes chalcone synthase (CHS) and chalcone reductase (CHR) modify to obtain trihydroxychalcone. CHR is NADPH dependent. Chalcone isomerase (CHI) then isomerizes trihydroxychalcone to liquiritigenin, the precursor to daidzein.

A radical mechanism has been proposed in order to obtain daidzein from liquiritigenin, where an iron-containing enzyme, as well as NADPH and oxygen cofactors are used by a 2-hydroxyisoflavone synthase to oxidize liquiritigenin to a radical intermediate (C). A 1,2 aryl migration follows to form (D), which is subsequently oxidized to (E). Lastly, dehydration of the hydroxy group on C2 occurs through a 2-hydroxyisoflavanone dehydratase (specifically GmHID1) to give daidzein.

Research
Daidzein has been found to act as an agonist of the GPER (GPR30).

Pathogen interactions
Because daidzein is a defensive factor, Pseudomonas syringae produces the HopZ1b effector which degrades a GmHID1 product.

Derivatives
 Glyceollin, a type of phytoalexin

Glycosides
 Daidzin is the 7-O-glucoside of daidzein.
 Puerarin is the 8-C-glucoside of daidzein.

Plants containing daidzein
 Maackia amurensis
 Pueraria montana var. lobata
 Pueraria thomsonii

References

3α-Hydroxysteroid dehydrogenase inhibitors
Isoflavones
Glycine receptor antagonists
GPER agonists
Phytoestrogens
Selective ERβ agonists